, also known as the , serves as a link between the mainland of Osaka, Japan to the artificial island in Osaka Bay on which Kansai International Airport is built. It is the longest double-decked truss bridge in the world. The bridge carries six lanes of automobile traffic on top and two of rail below, over nine truss spans.

Structural specifications

History
The bridge commenced construction in June 1987, and was completed in March 1994. On 21 April 2009, management of the expressway portion of the bridge was handed over to the West Nippon Expressway Company. This expressway was numbered E71 alongside the Kansai-Kūkō Expressway in 2016.

Typhoon Jebi
The bridge was damaged on 4 September 2018 by Typhoon Jebi. A 2600-ton tanker lost power and was blown into one side, severely damaging half of the automobile lanes and the rail lines. The bridge, being the sole link between the airport and the mainland, stranded approximately  passengers and  staff overnight at the airport. They were evacuated the next day via the  ferry to nearby Kobe Airport, later joined by buses over the undamaged half of the bridge.
The bridge was partially reopened to vehicle traffic on 7 March 2019 with four lanes open. The bridge's full capacity with six lanes of traffic was restored on 8 April 2019.

Junction list
The entire expressway is in Osaka Prefecture. The sequence of kilometer posts continue from the Kansai-Kūkō Expressway.

References 

1991 establishments in Japan
Bridges completed in 1991
Bridges in Osaka Prefecture
Roads in Osaka Prefecture
Railway bridges in Japan
Truss bridges
Road-rail bridges in Japan
Double-decker bridges